XHGK-TDT is a television station in Tapachula, Chiapas. XHGK broadcasts on virtual channel 13 (physical channel 26) and is part of the Canal 13 regional network.

History
XHGK's concession was awarded on June 19, 1984, to José de Jesús Partida Villanueva, a businessman with connections to Televisa; it originally specified channel 10 in Comitán de Domínguez, but XHGK would be quickly relocated to Tapachula on analog channel 4. In 1993, the station's concession was transferred to Comunicación del Sureste.

XHGK maintained a partnership with Televisa and carried programming from its Gala TV and Foro TV, and as a Televisa partner, Comunicación del Sureste was defined as within the "preponderant economic agent" in broadcasting for regulatory purposes. In 2014, XHGK sourced 82 percent of its broadcast day from Televisa. In 2017, simultaneous events prompted XHGK to disaffiliate from Televisa. One was the unwinding of many local relationships as Televisa began to multiplex Gala TV and Foro TV on subchannels of its own TV stations in some areas of the country where said programming had been broadcast on a local station, including Tapachula. Another was the successful participation of Telsusa Televisión México, S.A. de C.V., a company also controlled by Remigio Ángel González, in the IFT-6 television station auction, in which it acquired TV stations in twelve cities primarily in southern and eastern Mexico.

On October 18, 2018, XHGK and its sister stations moved to virtual channel 13.

Programming

XHGK's local program output includes local newscasts, branded as 13 Noticias del Soconusco (previously Noti-4), and a morning magazine and talk show, Giros (previously Chismoleando).

Outside of local programming, XHGK, its Chiapas sister station XHDY, and its Tabasco sister station XHTVL/XHTOE air almost all of the same programming. Weekends are taken up by older Mexican movies.

Transmitters 
In addition to the primary transmitter, XHGK-TDT is rebroadcast in two areas on additional repeaters.

|-

|}

References

Television stations in Chiapas
Television channels and stations established in 1984
1984 establishments in Mexico